This article is a list of diseases of safflowers (Carthamus tinctorius).

Bacterial diseases

Fungal diseases

Nematodes, parasitic

Viral and Phytoplasma

References
Common Names of Diseases, The American Phytopathological Society

Safflower